Gaius Sentius Saturninus was a Roman senator, and consul ordinarius for AD 4 as the colleague of Sextus Aelius Catus. He was the middle son of Gaius Sentius Saturninus, consul in 19 BC. During his consulate the Lex Aelia Sentia, concerning the manumission of slaves, was published.

Saturninus, with his brothers Gnaeus Sentius Saturninus, suffect consul in AD 4, and Lucius Sentius Saturninus, accompanied their father when he assumed the governorship of Syria in the years 9 through 7 BC, serving as his legati or assistants.

References 

1st-century BC Romans
1st-century Romans
Imperial Roman consuls
Saturninus (04), Gaius Sentius